Ikram Kerwat born March 18, 1984, in Béja, Tunisia, is a Tunisian-German boxer.

Amateur

Ikram Kerwat began practicing judo at the age of four, a sport she would continue to the age of eleven.  At the age of nine, she started boxing.  She emigrated to Frankfurt am Main, Germany at the age of thirteen, where she trained with Eppie (Efraim) Chapman (world champion and multiple European champion in Kickboxing and Karate), who was her coach for many years.

At the age of nineteen, she trained under Emil Freihaut (CSC Frankfurt). At the age of 25, she moved to Berlin with the goal of focusing on her career, becoming an amateur at SC Eintracht Berlin, where she won three bouts (two victories, one by K. and a defeat) and taking third place at the German Championship 2010. After having two children, she started a professional career at the end of 2013,  joining Legends Fight & Box Academy in Berlin.

Professional career

On February 27, 2015, Kerwat made her professional debut at Universal Hall in Berlin. In the first round, she met her opponent Sandy Weber from Leipzig so hard that the referee broke off the fight. Shortly afterwards the referee acknowledged the mismatch and Weber was removed from the ring, Kerwat winning by knockout.

On June 18, 2015, Kerwat's manager, Andreas Greiner announced that Enno Werle was appointed as long term coach.

On 1 August 2015, Kerwat fought against Polish Danka Kruczek in Babelsberg (Metropolis-Halle), Potsdam, winning through TKO in the 1 round (1.10 minutes).

Since September 2015, Ikram Kerwat has been trained by Sven Ottke.

On September 19, 2015, the lightweight Kerwat and Bojana Libiszewska (9 bouts, 1 victory, 8 losses) fought each other. Kerwat, seconded by former World Super Middleweight champion Sven Ottke, won on points.

On November 17, Kerwat defeated Laznar Catalinia after 18 seconds in the first round by TKO.

On 12 December 2015, Kerwat won by TKO against Zsofia Bedo in Dessau.

On 9 April 2016, Kerwat won the vacant title of international champion of the WBC in the first round against Gina Chamie by TKO in 98 seconds, and was crowned the WBC International Champion in lightweight on Saturday evening in Potsdam.

On 16 June after being trained in Germany by Ulli Wegner, Kerwat fought in Berlin's Max-Schmeling-Halle against world champion Ramona Kühne. After being knocked out in the 4th round, she conceded after an elbow injury in the 6th round.

After the injury-related break, Kerwat fought against Britain Hart on February 17, 2017, and won.

Since 2017 she has been travelling to Pensacola to train with Roy Jones Jr.

Personal

She took part in the "Give To Eat Mission" which provides food and medicine for children in Ghana.
Kerwat speaks four languages, is married with two children and lives in Berlin.

Professional boxing record

References

1984 births
Tunisian women boxers
People from Béja
Living people
German women boxers
German people of Tunisian descent